UTC+09:30 is an identifier for a time offset from UTC of +09:30.

As standard time (year-round)
Principal cities: Darwin, Alice Springs

Oceania
Australia – Central Standard Time (ACST)
Northern Territory

As standard time (Southern Hemisphere winter)
Principal cities: Adelaide, Broken Hill

Oceania
Australia – Central Standard Time (ACST)
New South Wales
Broken Hill
South Australia

See also
Time in Australia

References

UTC offsets